Harrington Arthur Harrop Hulton (9 November 1846 – 28 January 1923) was an English cricketer active in 1868 who played for Lancashire. He was born in Ashton-under-Lyne and died in Cheltenham. He appeared in two first-class matches, scoring 13 runs with a highest score of 6.

Notes

1846 births
1923 deaths
English cricketers
Lancashire cricketers